Hydrophorus nebulosus is a species of fly in the family Dolichopodidae. It is found in the  Palearctic .

References

External links
representing Hydrophorus nebulosus at BOLD

nebulosus
Insects described in 1823
Asilomorph flies of Europe
Taxa named by Carl Fredrik Fallén